Diocese of Myitkyina may refer to:

the Anglican Diocese of Myitkyina (Church of the Province of Myanmar)
the Roman Catholic Diocese of Myitkyina